Harpalus fraternus is a species of ground beetle in the subfamily Harpalinae. It was described by John Lawrence LeConte in 1852.

References

fraternus
Beetles described in 1852